Moses Orr (1847May 10, 1897) was an Irish-born soldier in the U.S. Army who served with the 1st U.S. Cavalry during the Apache Wars. He was one of several men who received the Medal of Honor for gallantry during Lieutenant Colonel George Crook's "winter campaign" against the Apache Indians in the Arizona Territory during 1872 and 1873.

Biography
Moses Orr was born in County Tyrone, Ireland in 1847. He later emigrated to the United States and enlisted in the U.S. Army in Philadelphia. Orr was assigned to Company A of the 1st U.S. Cavalry and took part in the Apache Wars during the 1870s. He served under Lieutenant Colonel George Crook's during his "winter campaign" against the Apache Indians in the Arizona Territory during 1872 and 1873. Orr was among the member of his regiment to receive the Medal of Honor for "gallant conduct during campaigns and engagements with the Apaches" on April 12, 1875. He returned to Philadelphia after leaving the military and died there on May 10, 1897, at the age of 50. Orr was buried at Mount Moriah Cemetery.

Medal of Honor citation
Rank and organization: Private, Company A, 1st U.S. Cavalry. Place and date: Winter of 1872–73. Entered service at:------. Birth: Ireland Date of issue: 12 April 1875.

Citation:

Gallant conduct during campaigns and engagements with Apaches.

See also

List of Medal of Honor recipients for the Indian Wars

References

External links
Grave

1847 births
1897 deaths
19th-century Irish people
Irish soldiers in the United States Army
American military personnel of the Indian Wars
United States Army Medal of Honor recipients
Military personnel from County Tyrone
Military personnel from Philadelphia
United States Army soldiers
Irish-born Medal of Honor recipients
Irish emigrants to the United States (before 1923)
American Indian Wars recipients of the Medal of Honor
Burials at Mount Moriah Cemetery (Philadelphia)